Donald Lewis Elser (August 4, 1913 – October 18, 1968) was an American professional basketball and football player. He played in the National Basketball League for the Toledo Jim White Chevrolets during the 1941–42 season and averaged 4.5 points per game. Elser also played for the Boston Shamrocks in the American Football League (sometimes known as "AFL II"). While at Notre Dame, Elser was selected to play in the 1936 Chicago College All-Star Game.

Elser was also a standout track and field athlete in college. He finished in second place (behind Olympian Jesse Owens) in the 220-yard low hurdles at the 1936 NCAA Track and Field Championships. He also finished fifth in the shot put, earning All-American status in both events.

References 

1913 births
1968 deaths
American men's basketball players
United States Navy personnel of World War II
Basketball players from Gary, Indiana
Benedictine Ravens football coaches
Boston Shamrocks (AFL) players
Centers (basketball)
College football officials
College men's basketball referees in the United States
Forwards (basketball)
Players of American football from Gary, Indiana
Notre Dame Fighting Irish football players
Notre Dame Fighting Irish men's basketball players
Notre Dame Fighting Irish men's track and field athletes
Sportspeople from Gary, Indiana
Toledo Jim White Chevrolets players